Mean world syndrome is a proposed cognitive bias wherein people may perceive the world to be more dangerous than it actually is, due to long-term moderate to heavy exposure to violence-related content in mass media.

Proponents of the syndrome—which was coined by communications professor George Gerbner in the 1970s—assert that viewers who are exposed to violence-related content can experience increased fear, anxiety, pessimism and heightened state of alert in response to perceived threats. This is because media (namely television) consumed by viewers has the power to directly influence and inform their attitudes, beliefs and opinions about the world.

History
The term mean world syndrome was coined in the late-1960s by U.S. communications professor George Gerbner, whose life's work explored the effects of television on viewers, particularly violent media.

Cultural Indicators Project and cultivation theory
In 1968, Gerbner established the Cultural Indicators Project (CIP), which was a pioneering analysis of the influence of television on people's attitudes and perceptions of the world. Holding a database of more than 3,000 television programs and 35,000 characters, this project documented the trends in television content and how these changes affect viewers' perceptions of the world.

The CIP would notably be used to analyze Gerbner's cultivation theory, which suggests that exposure to media, over time, "cultivates" viewers' perceptions of reality through images and ideological messages viewed on primetime or popular television. This content heavily influences the perception of events and thus can skew one's perception of the real world. Cultivation theory asserts that "the more time people spend 'living' in the television world, the more likely they are to believe social reality aligns with reality portrayed on television." In 1968, Gerbner conducted a survey to validate cultivation theory and his hypothesis that watching extensive TV affects the attitudes and beliefs of an individual toward the world. Categorizing survey respondents into three groups—"light viewers" (less than 2 hours a day), "medium viewers" (2–4 hours a day), and "heavy viewers" (more than 4 hours a day)—Gerbner found that the latter group held beliefs and opinions similar to those portrayed on television rather than ones based in real-world circumstances, demonstrating the compound effect of media influence. These "heavy viewers" experienced shyness, loneliness, and depression much more than those who did not watch television or who did not watch television nearly as much. 

Accordingly, cultivation theory laid the theoretical groundwork for the mean world syndrome, which Gerbner defined in the CIP as the phenomenon in which people who watch moderate to large amounts of television are more likely to perceive the world as a dangerous and frightening place.

Research findings
The findings of the Cultural Indicators Project confirmed many of Gerbner's hypotheses. Gerbner found a direct correlation between the amount of television one watches and the amount of fear one tends to have about being victimized in everyday life. That is, people who watched moderate to high levels of television perceived the world to be a more intimidating and unforgiving place than viewers who watched less television. Furthermore, viewers who consumed television at a higher rate also believed that greater protection by law enforcement is needed and reported that most people "cannot be trusted" and are "just looking out for themselves". These findings amplified Gerbner's concerns about exposure to media violence because as he said, "The consequence of regular or heavy viewing of television is a normalization of unhealthy and violent behavior. It is a cultivation that the concept [of violence] is normal and accepted in society." 

Gerbner was particularly concerned about the impact violent media was having on children. During the CIP, Gerbner found that children had seen about 8,000 murders on television by the end of elementary school, and about 200,000 violent acts by the age of 18. Gerber stated.Our studies have shown that growing up from infancy with this unprecedented diet of violence has three consequences, which, in combination, I call the 'mean world syndrome'. What this means is that if you are growing up in a home where there is more than say three hours of television per day, for all practical purposes you live in a meaner world - and act accordingly - than your next-door neighbor who lives in the same world but watches less television. The programming reinforces the worst fears and apprehensions and paranoia of people.

In 1981, Gerbner took his findings and testified before a congressional subcommittee about the damage he believed violent media was inflicting on Americans, particularly children. "Fearful people are more dependent, more easily manipulated and controlled, more susceptible to deceptively simple, strong, tough measures and hard-line measures," he explained. Since then, hundreds of studies and countless congressional hearings have looked at the issue of media violence and the same conclusion is always drawn—television can propagate violent conduct and skew people's perceptions of violence and crime.

The Mean World Index 
The findings of the cultivation theory study led Gerbner and Larry Gross to further develop it in 1976 using findings from their several large-scale research projects. Believing that "who tells the stories of a culture really governs human behavior," Gerbner claimed that a major cultural shift was taking place, wherein such storytellers "used to be the parent, the school, the church, the community," but is now "a handful of global conglomerates that have nothing to tell, but a great deal to sell." Using the theory, Gerbner would explore the effects of violence-related content on TV on the attitudes and beliefs of an individual about crime and violence in the world, which he dubbed The Mean World Index. Since TV was becoming an ever-increasing presence in the average American household and the amount of violence on TV was growing exponentially, Gerbner conducted several large-scale studies that upheld his hypothesis: those who watched moderate to large amounts of TV believed the world to be a more dangerous place.

Later research

Since the 1970s, numerous studies have corroborated Gerbner's findings that moderate-to-heavy viewing of violence-related content on TV increased depression, fear, anxiety, anger, pessimism, post-traumatic stress, and substance use.

In 2009, the American Academy of Pediatrics released a policy statement on media violence which concluded that "extensive research evidence indicates that media violence can contribute to aggressive behavior, desensitization to violence, nightmares, and fear of being harmed."

A study conducted in 2018 by researchers at the University of Oklahoma found that there is "good evidence establishing a relationship between disaster television viewing and various psychological outcomes."

Evolution of mass media
Though the focus of Gerbner's research was television viewing, cultivation theory has been validated in studies exploring different forms of media, such as newspapers, film, and even photographs, essentially in any context social observation occurs in any form outside of one's natural environment.

Gerbner's research focused on TV, as social media was just blossoming in 2006 when he died. However, increasingly researchers are expanding their assessments of mass media, looking at the effects of social media as well as television. Research continues to explore the effects of violence-related content on heavy TV consumers but has also branched out to explore the role that social media is playing in consumption of violence related content. 

Increasingly similar questions are being asked about the impact of social media on our emotions and perceptions of the world. Though it is too new to draw definitive conclusions, a growing body of literature suggests that social media can have similar psychological effects to that of television providing further support for Gerbner's theory. Jean Kim, a psychiatrist for the U.S. State Department, said that social media "is not as visceral as seeing an event on television…but if you're overly getting caught up in troll wars or controversy online, you might be getting a skewed view and be prone to being directly affected."

The Mean World Syndrome documentary

In 2010, the Media Education Foundation filmed a documentary titled The Mean World Syndrome: Media Violence & the Cultivation of Fear summarizing the work of Gerbner and others about the effects of violent media on people's opinions, attitudes, and beliefs. The documentary features Gerbner himself speaking about his research on violence in media and the effects this has had on the American public since the addition of sound to television in the 1930s. The film is narrated by Michael Morgan who worked closely with Gerbner on his research about cultivation theory and mean world syndrome.

See also

Appeal to fear
Availability heuristic
Crime rate
Cultivation theory
Culture of fear
Cognitive bias
Deviancy amplification spiral
Doomscrolling
Fascination with death
Fear, uncertainty and doubt
For the children (politics)
Gatekeeping
Just-world hypothesis
Media bias
Missing white woman syndrome
Moral panic
Negativity bias
News values
Sensationalism
United States incarceration rate#Editorial policies of major media
The Better Angels of Our Nature (2011)
Thinking, Fast and Slow (2011)
Enlightenment Now (2018)

References

1970s neologisms
Cognitive biases
Communication theory
Fear
Media bias
Media studies
Syndromes
Television controversies